Nick Robinson (born 8 January 1957 in Burnham-on-Sea, England) is a British paperfolder. He was awarded the Sydney French Medal in 2004 by the British Origami Society and is an Honorary Member and President of the British Origami Society.

He has folded a kaleidoscope of projects over the course of his career, but is drawn to folding containers, masks, and simple designs. His approach to origami is to try and capture the essence of a subject using minimal creases, rather than a more realistic representation. He is actively involved with the Folding Didactic movement, which aims to promote academic study of the history of paper-folding and the most effective way to teach it.

Publications 
Robinson is a prolific author, having written nearly 100 books of origami. Some of the books written by Robinson include: 
World's Best Origami 2010  
Origami For Dummies Wiley & Co 2008  
Picture Perfect Origami St. Martin's Griffin 2008  
The Origami Giftbox Firefly Books 2006.  
A Beginners Guide to Origami Parragon Books, 2006. 
Encyclopedia of Origami Quarto Publishing 2005. 
Pub Origami New Holland Publishers 2005. 
Adult Origami New Holland Publishers 2004. 
The Origami Bible Collins & Brown 2004. 
Paper Planes that Really Fly Quintet Publishing 1992. 

You can also find diagrams for folding some of Robinson's original models on his personal website along with his range of self-published books.

Teaching 
Robinson is an experienced origami teacher who has taught paper folding classes to both children and adults since 1984. He has worked in schools, youth clubs, hospitals, art galleries, prisons, libraries, and shopping centers within the UK. He has also taught and lectured on origami in America, Ireland, France, Germany, Austria, Switzerland, Spain, Catalonia, Italy, the United Arab Emirates and Japan.

Commercial work 
Robinson has used his origami skills in many commercial projects over the course of his career, including creating a trophy for the British Book Design and Production Awards and designing models for Kelloggs "Art Attack" promotion. He also worked with Verve Clicquot, The Victoria and Albert Museum, N-Power, Xerox, Ribena, Penguin, Google, the Guardian newspaper, Waddingtons, Norske Skog, Chatsworth House, Bibbi, Sappi and many others. He also created origami models as part of an effort to promote a book called "The Airman" by Eion Colfer.

Personal life 
Robinson lives in Sheffield, Yorkshire. Although he has been working as a professional origami teacher since over 30 years, Robinson was formerly a professional musician, performing with Typhoon Saturday, the Comsat Angels and Neil Ardley.

He still performs as a “looping” guitarist working extensively in the Sheffield improvised music scene. His band Das Rad have released 3 albums and he released a solo guitar  album "Lost Garden" in 2022.

References

External links
 Nick Robinson's origami website
 British Origami Society Honours page
 Interview with Nick Robinson on About Origami
 World's Best Origami on LoveToKnow
 Nick Robinson's Amazon author page
 Interview (in German)
 Encyclopædia Britannica entry written by Nick Robinson
 Nick Robinson's page on japansociety website

Origami artists
Artists from Sheffield
Living people
1957 births